Analog transmission is a transmission method of conveying information using a continuous signal which varies in amplitude, phase, or some other property in proportion to that information. It could be the transfer of an analog signal, using an analog modulation method such as frequency modulation (FM) or amplitude modulation (AM), or no modulation at all.

Some textbooks also consider passband data transmission using a digital modulation method such as ASK, PSK and QAM, i.e. a sinewave modulated by a digital bit-stream, as analog transmission and as an analog signal. Others define that as digital transmission and as a digital signal. Baseband data transmission using line codes, resulting in a pulse train, are always considered as digital transmission, although the source signal may be a digitized analog signal.

Methods

Analog transmission can be conveyed in many different fashions:
 Optical fiber
 Twisted pair or coaxial cable
 Radio
 Underwater acoustic communication

There are two basic kinds of analog transmission, both based on how they modulate data to combine an input signal with a carrier signal. Usually, this carrier signal is a specific frequency, and data is transmitted through its variations. The two techniques are amplitude modulation (AM), which varies the amplitude of the carrier signal, and frequency modulation (FM), which modulates the frequency of the carrier.

Types

Most analog transmissions fall into one of several categories. Telephony and voice communication was originally primarily analog in nature, as was most television and radio transmission. Early telecommunication devices utilized analog-to-digital conversion devices called modulator/demodulators, or modems, to convert analog signals to digital signals and back.

Benefits and drawbacks

The analog transmission method is still very popular, in particular for shorter distances, due to significantly lower costs and complex multiplexing and timing equipment is unnecessary, and in small "short-haul" systems that simply do not need multiplexed digital transmission.

However, in situations where a signal often has high signal-to-noise ratio and cannot achieve source linearity, or in long distance, high output systems, analog is unattractive due to attenuation problems. Furthermore, as digital techniques continue to be refined, analog systems are increasingly becoming legacy equipment.

Recently, some nations, such as the Netherlands, have completely ceased analog transmissions (analog switch-off) on certain media, such as television, for the purposes of the government saving money.

See also
 Analog television
 Analog-to-digital converter
 Digital transmission
 Modulation
 Signal

References

Electronic design
Radio modulation modes
Telecommunication theory
Physical layer protocols
Data transmission